Nancy K. Barto (born in Chicago, Illinois) is an American politician and a former Republican member of the Arizona State Senate from 2021 to 2023. She previously served in the Arizona House of Representatives from 2019 to 2021 and the Arizona Senate representing District 15 from 2013 to 2019. Barto served consecutively in the Arizona State Legislature from January 2007 until January 10, 2011 in the Arizona House of Representatives District 7 seat, then in the Arizona Senate in the District 7 seat from January 10, 2011 until January 14, 2013.

Tenure in office
Barto sponsored a bill to prohibit cities and counties in Arizona from banning plastic bags. The governor signed the bill into law in April 2015.

A social conservative, Barto has promoted anti-abortion legislation. She is often allied with the Center for Arizona Policy, a Christian right group. In 2010, Barto sponsored a measure to extend Arizona's two-month mandatory waiting period to obtain a divorce to six months. In 2020, while in the state House, Barto sponsored legislation that banned sex education before the fifth grade and requiring written permission from parents (an "opt-in") being students could be taught about HIV/AIDS, sexuality, gender identity or gender expression. In 2020, she narrowly ousted incumbent state Senator Heather Carter, defeating her in a Republican primary challenge from the right following a heated race.

As chair of the House Health and Human Services Committee, Barto sponsored anti-vaccination bills, and supporting vaping legislation supported by the tobacco industry. Public health officials warned that Barto's three bills in 2019 to expand vaccination exemptions and discourage vaccination would reduce immunization rates in Arizona and endanger public health. One bill, HB2470, would have added a non-medical "religious belief" exemption for childhood vaccines, and removed a signature requirement for parents. The proposed repeal would end a requirement that parents exempting children from vaccines acknowledge the risk of serious illness and death from infectious disease. Another bill, HB2471, would require doctors to inform parents about potential risks of vaccines and how to file for injury claims related to vaccines. The third bill, HB2472 would require doctors to offer a blood test prior to vaccination; the test would determine if a child already possesses the antibodies that would be developed from a vaccine.

During the COVID-19 pandemic in Arizona, Barto promoted baseless claims that hydroxychloroquine was a COVID-19 cure, and discouraged COVID-19 vaccination.

In 2020, Barto was one of 13 Arizona Republican state legislators who supported Donald Trump's failed attempt to overturn his loss in the 2020 presidential election.

In 2022, she sponsored legislation that banned abortion after 15 weeks of pregnancy. Barto lost reelection to Christine Marsh.

Elections
2006: To challenge House District 7 incumbent Republican Representatives Ray Barnes and David Smith, Barto ran in the four-way September 12, 2006 Republican Primary; Barto placed first with 7,218 votes and Representative Barnes placed second; in the five-way November 7, 2006 General election, Barto took the first seat with 29,952 votes and Representative Barnes took the second seat ahead of Democratic nominees Marilyn Fox, Jeanne Lunn, and Libertarian candidate Jim Iannuzo, who had run for a House seat in 2004.

† Won nomination for general election

'2008: Barto, Republican Representative Barnes, Democratic nominee Jeanne Lunn, and Libertarian candidate Jim Iannuzo were unopposed for their September 2, 2008 primaries, setting up a rematch; in the four-way November 4, 2008 General election, Barto took the first seat with 46,854 votes and Representative Barnes took the second seat ahead of Democratic nominee Jeanne Lunn and Libertarian candidate Jim Iannuzo.

2010: When Republican Senator Jim Waring ran for Phoenix City Council and left the Senate District 7 seat open, Barto and Representative Barnes both ran in the four-way August 24, 2010 Republican Primary, where Barto placed first with 10,475 votes (46.2%); in the November 2, 2010 General election, winning with 41,849 votes (67.2%) against Democratic nominee Eric Shelley.

† Won nomination for general election

2012: State Senator – District No. 15
Redistricted to District 15, Barto was unopposed for the August 28, 2012 Republican Primary, winning with 19,162 votes, and won the November 6, 2012 General election with 58,283 votes (73.2%) against Libertarian nominee Dennis Grenier.

2014: State Senator – District No. 15: Barto defeated David Ryan in the primary, then ran unopposed in the general election.

† Won nomination for general election

2016: State Senator – District No. 15
Barto ran unopposed in the primary, then defeated the Democratic candidate, Tonya MacBeth, in the general election.

2018: State Representative – District No. 15: Barto and John Allen ran unopposed in the primary, then both defeated the Democratic candidates, Julie Gunnigle and Jennifer Samuels, in the general election.

References

External links
Official page at the Arizona State Legislature
Campaign site
 

Year of birth missing (living people)
Living people
Republican Party Arizona state senators
Arizona State University alumni
Republican Party members of the Arizona House of Representatives
Politicians from Chicago
Politicians from Phoenix, Arizona
Women state legislators in Arizona
21st-century American politicians
21st-century American women politicians